Jalalabad (also Romanized as Jalālābād) is a village in Faragheh Rural District, in the Central District of Abarkuh County, Yazd Province, Iran. At the 2006 census, its population was 42, in 12 families.

References 

Populated places in Abarkuh County